Veikko Karppinen is a Finnish ice hockey player who currently plays professionally in Finland for Oulun Kärpät of the SM-liiga.

References

External links

Living people
Oulun Kärpät players
Year of birth missing (living people)
Finnish ice hockey forwards